Woodsville is a hamlet and census-designated place (CDP) in Livingston County, New York, United States. Its population was 70 as of the 2020 census. New York State Route 36 passes through the community.

Geography
Woodsville is in southern Livingston County, mainly in the southeastern corner of the town of West Sparta. A small part of the CDP extends eastward into the town of North Dansville. NY 36 leads southeast  to Dansville and northwest  to Mount Morris. Interstate 390 runs along the southwestern edge of Woodsville, with access from Exit 5 just southeast of the community. I-390 leads north  to Rochester and southeast  to Interstate 86 in Avoca.

Demographics

References

Hamlets in Livingston County, New York
Hamlets in New York (state)
Census-designated places in Livingston County, New York
Census-designated places in New York (state)